Stephen Holbrook Rhodes (November 7, 1825 – June 11, 1909)  was a Massachusetts  businessman and politician who served in the Massachusetts Senate,  as the second Mayor of Taunton, Massachusetts, and as the fourth President of The John Hancock Mutual Life Insurance Company.

Early life
Rhodes was born in Franklin, Massachusetts on  November 7, 1825 to Stephen and Betsy (Bird) Rhodes.

Family life
Rhodes married E. M. Godfry in Taunton, Massachusetts on November 27, 1847.

Death
Rhodes died on June 11, 1909 at his home in Brookline, Massachusetts.

See also
 1870 Massachusetts legislature
 1871 Massachusetts legislature

Notes

 
 
  
 

1825 births
1909 deaths
Massachusetts state senators
Politicians from Brookline, Massachusetts
People from Franklin, Massachusetts
Mayors of Taunton, Massachusetts
American chief executives
Massachusetts city council members
19th-century American politicians
19th-century American businesspeople